Taejo Wang Geon is a 2000  Korean historical period drama. Directed by Kim Jong-sun and starring Choi Soo-jong in the title role of King Taejo. The drama aired from April 1, 2000 to February 24, 2002 in a total of 200 episodes. In the scene dealing with the end of Gungye (the 120th episode), it gained a lot of popularity, recording the highest viewership rating of 60.4% in the metropolitan area.

Cast

Main
Choi Soo-jong as King Taejo (Wang Geon)
Oh Hyun-chul as young Wang Geon
Kim Yeong-cheol as Gung Ye 
Maeng Se-chang as young Gung Ye
Kim Hye-ri as Queen Kang Yeon Hwa
Jung Hoo as young Yeon Hwa
Seo In-seok as Gyeon Hwon

Supporting
Park Sang-ah as Empress Shin Hye of the Yoo clan, Wang Geon's first wife
Yum Jung-ah as Empress Jang Hwa of the Oh clan, Wang Geon's second wife
Jeon Mi-seon as Empress Shin Myung Sun Sung of the Yoo clan, Wang Geon's third wife
Ahn Jung-hoon as Wang Mu (son of Jang Hwa, future Emperor Hyejong)
Kim Kap-soo as Jong Gan
Jeon Moo-song as Choi Seung Woo
Kim In-tae as Ahjitae
Jung Jin as Neung Whan
Kim Sung-kyum as Ajagae
Lee Mi-ji as Ajagae's wife
Shin Goo as Wang Ryung, (father of Wang Gun)
Seo Woo-rim as Wang Ryung's wife
Kim Hyung-il as Neung San (later renamed as Shin Sung Kyum)
Kang In-duk as Yoo Geum Pil
Kim Hak-chul as Park Sul Hee
Lee Kye-in as Ae Sul

Extended

Kim Ha-kyun as Tae Pyeong
Jung Tae-woo as Choi Eung
Kim Myung-soo as Wang Gyu
Jung Kook-jin as Wang Shik Ryum
Kil Yong-woo as Bok Ji Gyum
Lee Kwang-ki as Shin Gum (Kyun Hwon's son)
Kim Young-chan as young Shin Gum
Park Sang-jo as Eun Boo
Park Ji-young as Choi Ji Mong
Jang Hang-sun as Wang Pyung Dal
Tae Min-young as Shin Kang
No Hyun-hee as Queen Jin Sung
Choi Woon Kyo as Geum Dae (Gung Ye's subordinate general)
Song Yong-tae as Hong Yoo (Hong Sul)
Shin Dong-hoon as Bae Hyun Kyung
Kim Ki-bok as Kim Rak
Na Han-il as Byun Sa Bu ('Sa Bu' means 'master')
Park Young-mok as Ma Sa Bu
Jang Soon-gook as Jang Soo Jang ('Soo Jang' means 'captain' or 'leader', 'chief')
Lee Dae-ro as Ambassador Do Sun
Shim Woo-chang as Yeom Sang
Lee Young-ho as Yang Gum
Seo Hoo as young Yang Gum
Jun Hyun as Geum Kang
Kang Jae-il as Chu Heo Jo
Kim Si-won as General Soo Dal
Seo Young-jin as Ambassador Kyung Bo
Lee Il-woong as Oh Da Ryun
Seo Sang-shik as Na Chong Rye
Baek In-chul as Hwan Sun Gil
Choi Joo-bong as Lee Heun Am
Park Chul-ho as Ji Hwon
Suh Yoon-jae as Ok Yi
Im Byung-ki as Shin Deok
Geum Bo-ra as Mrs. Park (queen consort of  Gyeon-hwon)
Jun Byung-ok as Neung Ae
Lee Jung-woong as Gong Jik
Im Hyuk-joo as Park Young Kyu
Han Jung-gook as Choi Pil
Shin Gook as Young Soon
Choi Byung-hak as Jong Hoon
Ki Jung-soo as Pa Dal
Kim Joo-young as Kim Wi Hong
Lee Byung-wook as Prince Maui
Moon Hoe-won as King Gyeong Ae
Shin Kwi-sik as King Gyeong Sun
Kim Hyo-won as Kim Hyo Jong
Yoo Byung-joon as Kim Yool
Park Tae-min as Won Geuk Yoo
Kim Bong-geun as Park Jil
Min Ji-hwan as Kim Haeng Sun
Kim Sung-ok as Kang Jang Ja ('Jang Ja' literally means 'old man', it can means 'elder')
Park Joo-ah as Mrs. Baek
Ahn Dae-yong as Monk Beom Gyo
Lee Kye-young as Yoon Shin Dal
Kang Man-hee as Jun Yi Gab
Kwon Hyuk-ho as Jun Ui Gab
Kim Ok-man as Geum Shik
Kim Jin-tae as Park Yoo
Park Sang-kyu as Kim Soon Shik
Lee Chi-woo as Yang Gil
Jo Jae-hoon as Im Choon Gil
Oh Sung-yul as Ip Jun
Jo Yong-tae as Jong Hoe
Suh Hyun-suk as Hye Jong
Kang In-ki as Yong Gum
Yun Woon-kyung as royal household nanny
Min Wook as Yoo Geung Dal
Jo In-pyo as Kim Un
Jang Seo-hee
Seo Bum-shik
Jang Jung-hee
Kim Dong-suk
Park Byung-ho
Kim Won-bae
Kim Tae-hyung

Awards
2000 KBS Drama Awards
Grand Prize (Daesang): Kim Yeong-cheol
2001 KBS Drama Awards
Grand Prize (Daesang): Choi Soo-jong
Top Excellence Award, Actor: Seo In-seok
Excellence Award, Actor: Kim Kap-soo
Excellence Award, Actress: Kim Hye-ri
Best Supporting Actor: Jung Tae-woo
Best New Actor: Lee Kwang-ki
Special Award: Taejo Wang Geon Martial Arts Team

See also
 Wang-geon, the Great

References

External links
 

Korean Broadcasting System television dramas
Korean-language television shows
2000 South Korean television series debuts
2002 South Korean television series endings
Television series set in Goryeo
Television series set in Later Three Kingdoms
Television series set in the 10th century
Television series set in the 9th century
South Korean historical television series